"Stray Cat Blues" is the eighth song on the Rolling Stones' album Beggars Banquet. It was written by Mick Jagger and Keith Richards and produced by Jimmy Miller. Miller's production of the song is very representative of his style, featuring a very prominent hi hat beat, droning piano performed by Nicky Hopkins, a mellotron performed by Brian Jones, all electric guitars performed by Richards and vocals from Jagger kept even in the mix. According to Mick Jagger, the song was inspired by "Heroin" by the Velvet Underground, with the intros of both songs being particularly similar.

Background
The song is told from the perspective of a man lusting for illegal sex with a 15-year-old groupie, reasoning that "it's no hanging matter, it's no capital crime". During the performance of the song from the Get Yer Ya-Ya's Out! 1970 live album, he changed the lyric to "thirteen years old".

Jim Beviglia ranked "Stray Cat Blues" the 49th best Rolling Stones song in Counting Down the Rolling Stones: Their 100 Finest Songs. Uncut called it "an absolutely filthy song" but ranked it 39th in its Top 40 Rolling Stones songs. Rolling Stone ranked it 43rd in its countdown of the band's top 100 songs, calling it "a sleazy rocker."

Nitzer Ebb covered this song on the "I Give To You" single in 1991.
Johnny Winter covered this song in 1974. A version of the song also appeared on Soundgarden's 1992 EP Satanoscillatemymetallicsonatas and as a B-side on the single for their song "Jesus Christ Pose".

The song appears in 'the video game Guitar Hero: Warriors of Rock and in the film Joy.

Personnel
Mick Jaggerlead vocals
Keith Richards electric guitar, slide guitar, bass
Brian JonesMellotron 
Charlie Wattsdrums
Nicky Hopkinspiano
 Rocky Dijoncongas

References

The Rolling Stones songs
1968 songs
Songs written by Jagger–Richards
Song recordings produced by Jimmy Miller
Songs about child abuse